Gymnastics Australia (GA) is the governing body for the sport of gymnastics in Australia.

History
Gymnastics in Australia is thought to have originated in the early 20th century by eastern European immigrants. It wasn't until after World War I when Australia was in the Great Depression that people started turning to organisations like the YWCA for support. From these community-based groups, the sport started to flourish. Around the same time, gymnastics was included in the school curriculum at Geelong Grammar, Wesley College and Carey Grammar.  Australians participated in the sport for the first time at an Olympic Games at the Melbourne Games in Melbourne.

The body was founded on 8 September 1949 as the Australian Gymnastic Federation. Affiliation was accepted by the Australian Olympic Federation in 1951 and by the International Federation of Gymnastics in 1954. In 1999, the AGF changed to its current name of Gymnastics Australia.

Present day
Gymnastics Australia runs a head office in Melbourne, Victoria, and is the representative body to FIG. Gymnastics Australia coordinates and provides gymnastics for Australians through eight Association Members:
 ACT Gymnastics Association Inc.
 NSW Gymnastics Association Inc.
 NT Gymnastics Association Inc.
 Queensland Gymnastics Association Inc.
 Gymnastics South Australian Inc.
 Tasmania Gymnastics Associations Inc.
 Gymnastics Victoria Inc.
 Gymnastics Western Australia Inc.

Gymnastics Australia sets the routines and routine guidelines for the National Levels Program which are used by gymnasts around the country.

Prominent gymnastics from Australia through the ages include Lauren Mitchell, the first Australian gymnast to win gold on floor at the 2010 World Championships and Damian Istria who won gold on floor in the 2006 Commonwealth Games.

See also
 Australia women's national gymnastics team

References

External links

 

National members of the International Gymnastics Federation
Gymnastics in Australia
Sports governing bodies in Australia
1949 establishments in Australia
Sports organizations established in 1949
Organisations based in Melbourne